In the Life was a lesbian, gay, bisexual and transgender (LGBT) television newsmagazine, broadcast on public television and produced by In The Life Media. It was created in 1991 by the Emmy Award-winning producer John Scagliotti. Premiering on June 9, 1992, it was the first and longest running national LGBT television program in history.

In September 2012, In The Life Media announced that the December 2012 broadcast would be the last. ITLM said it would work with other organizations to create a web-based archive of historical videos documenting the LGBT rights movement, enhancing the organization's online presence and hopefully broadening its reach.

On March 3, 2013, UCLA Film & Television Archive officially became the new home for In the Life'''s full collection.

Hosts
The series was regularly commentated by Harvey Fierstein from 2001 to 2004. Past hosts of the show include Kate Clinton and Katherine Linton. Guest hosts for the series have included Cherry Jones, Paris Barclay, Janeane Garofalo, Lesley Gore, Lea DeLaria, Madonna, Jade Esteban Estrada, Nathan Lane, Howard Dean, Gavin Newsom, Helen Thomas, Nancy Grace, RuPaul, Angela Lansbury, Jerry Herman, Carol Channing, Larry Kramer, Barbara Gittings, Lillian Faderman, Judy Shepard, Susan Sarandon, Billie Jean King, Lily Tomlin, Melissa Etheridge, Esera Tuaolo, Martina Navratilova, Judith Light, Margaret Cho, Le Tigre, Lady Bunny, Wilson Cruz, Alan Cumming, Bill Brochtrup, Staceyann Chin and Lisa Leslie. In its 18th season, In the Life'' moved from a hosted format to a documentary style narrated by guest voice-overs.

Episodes

References

External links
 
 
 In the Life at IMDB
 UCLA Film & Television Archive

1992 American television series debuts
1990s American LGBT-related television series
2000s American LGBT-related television series
2010s American LGBT-related television series
2012 American television series endings
PBS original programming